The Defense Production Act of 1950 is a United States federal law enacted on September 8, 1950 in response to the start of the Korean War. It was part of a broad civil defense and war mobilization effort in the context of the Cold War. Its implementing regulations, the Defense Priorities and Allocation System (DPAS), are located at 15 CFR §§700 to 700.93. Since 1950, the Act has been reauthorized over 50 times. It has been periodically amended and remains in force.

Provisions
The Act currently contains three major sections. The first authorizes the president to require businesses to accept and prioritize contracts for materials deemed necessary for national defense, regardless of a loss incurred on business. The law does not state what would occur if a business refuses or is unable to complete a request on time. However, any person who performs any act prohibited or willfully fails to perform any act required by the Defense Production Act may be charged with a felony that results in a fine up to $10,000 or imprisonment for up to one year or both per violation. The second section authorizes the president to establish mechanisms (such as regulations, orders or agencies) to allocate materials, services and facilities to promote national defense. The third section authorizes the president to control the civilian economy so that scarce and critical materials necessary to the national defense effort are available for defense needs.

The original act included four other titles that are expired and repealed under current law that allowed the president to seize private property under Title II, fix wages and prices and implement rationing of goods under Title IV, use force to settle labor disputes under Title V, and control real estate credit under Title VI. Although the president can no longer fix wages and prices of goods, the president can still order to prevent hoarding and selling of designated items "in excess of prevailing market prices" under Title I in section 102 of the Defense Production Act.

The president's designation of products under the jurisdiction of the DPA is the authority of the Act most often used by the Department of Defense (DOD) since the 1970s. Most of the other functions of the Act are administered by the Office of Strategic Industries and Economic Security (SIES) in the Bureau of Industry and Security in the Department of Commerce.

The Defense Priorities and Allocations System institutes a rating system for contracts and purchase orders.  The highest priority is DX, which must be approved by the Secretary of Defense.  The next level down is DO, and below that are unrated contracts.

Under section 721 of the Defense Production Act of 1950, an inter-agency committee known as the (CFIUS) Committee on Foreign Investment in the United States is authorized to investigate and review transactions involving foreign investment and/or real estate transactions by foreign persons and/or entities in the United States. Civil penalties may result in up to $250,000 per violation or the value of the transaction, whichever is greater, on any persons and/or entities that willfully violated CFIUS regulations, and any mitigation orders, conditions, or agreements imposed by CFIUS. The CFIUS serves as an administrative body to refer and advise the president should the transaction need to be rejected or limited. The law only grants the president the authorization and decision to reject or limit the transaction within a 15-day presidential review period.

Use

Korean War
The DPA, passed by the U.S. Congress in September 1950, was first used during the Korean War to establish a large defense mobilization infrastructure and bureaucracy. Under the authority of the Act, President Harry S. Truman eventually established the Office of Defense Mobilization, instituted wage and price controls, strictly regulated production in heavy industries such as steel and mining, prioritized and allocated industrial materials in short supply, and ordered the dispersal of wartime manufacturing plants across the nation.

Cold War
The Act also played a vital role in the establishment of the domestic aluminum and titanium industries in the 1950s. Using the Act, DOD provided capital and interest-free loans, and directed mining and manufacturing resources as well as skilled laborers to these two processing industries. The DPA was also used in the 1950s to ensure that government-funded industries were geographically dispersed across the United States to prevent the industrial base from being destroyed by a single nuclear attack. During the late 1960s and early 1970s, the DPA increasingly was used to diversify the US energy mix by funding the trans-Alaskan pipeline, the US synthetic fuels corporation, and research into liquefied natural gas.

Technological innovation
Beginning in the 1980s, the DOD began using the contracting and spending provisions of the DPA to provide seed money to develop new technologies. The DOD has used the act to help develop a number of new technologies and materials, including silicon carbide ceramics, indium phosphide and gallium arsenide semiconductors, microwave power tubes, radiation-hardened microelectronics, superconducting wire, metal composites and the mining and processing of rare earth minerals.

FEMA National Security Resource Preparedness
In June 1994, President Bill Clinton invoked the law to implement national security resource preparedness during disasters under the advisement of the FEMA director. The order allows FEMA work with other federal departments to order producers and distributors to prioritize resources in preparation of and in times of disasters.

21st century

California Energy Crisis
In January 2001, President Bill Clinton invoked the law to force gas suppliers to continue to supply Pacific Gas and Electric Company, the largest California energy provider, with gas regardless of loss as a result of suppliers shutting off gas supplies due to the PG&E's non-payment during the 2000–01 California electricity crisis. The order was later rescinded under the George W. Bush administration but resulted in the expansion of blackouts in California for several months and PG&E's bankruptcy.

Cyberespionage
In 2011, President Barack Obama invoked the law to force telecommunications companies, under criminal penalties, to provide detailed information to the Commerce Department's Bureau of Industry and Security on the use of foreign-manufactured hardware and software in the companies' networks, as part of efforts to combat Chinese cyberespionage.

Materials Critical to National Defense
On June 13, 2017, President Donald Trump invoked the law to classify two sets of products as "critical to national defense". The first referenced "items affecting aerospace structures and fibers, radiation-hardened microelectronics, radiation test and qualification facilities, and satellite components and assemblies". The second referenced "items affecting adenovirus vaccine production capability; high strength, inherently fire and ballistic resistant, co-polymer aramid fibers industrial capability; secure hybrid composite shipping container industrial capability; and three-dimensional ultra-high density microelectronics for information protection industrial capability".

COVID-19 pandemic 
On March 18, 2020, in response to the COVID-19 outbreak, President Trump issued an executive order that defined ventilators and protective equipment as "essential to the national defense", the standard required by the DPA. Later that day, he indicated that he would not make immediate use of DPA authority, writing, "Hopefully there will be no need"; he indicated that he would do so in a "worst-case scenario". Speaker of the House Nancy Pelosi called upon Trump to "immediately use the powers of the DPA" to produce and distribute critically needed hospital equipment. On March 20, Trump said that he would use the DPA. The next day General Motors (GM) CEO Mary Barra spoke to Trump administration officials about how GM could support production of ventilators without the use of DPA. All this was set into motion by a grandiose academic paper.

On March 23, Trump issued an executive order classifying "health and medical resources necessary to respond to the spread of COVID-19" as subject to the authority granted by DPA to prohibit hoarding and price gouging.

Trump's initial reluctance to use the act's authorities prompted criticism. On March 27, 2020, after negotiations with GM had broken down over costs, estimated at over $1 billion, but primarily due to GM's inability to commit to timely delivery of the number of required ventilators, Trump ordered HHS Secretary Alex Azar to use the DPA to require GM to accept and prioritize contracts for as many ventilators as Azar determines to be appropriate. Trump also named Peter Navarro national policy coordinator for the DPA.

On April 2, Trump said he was invoking the DPA to require 3M, General Electric, and Medtronic to increase its production of N95 respirators.

On April 28, Trump announced that he intended to issue an executive order under the Defense Production Act mandating that plants producing beef, pork, poultry, and eggs stay open, a move which also prompted criticism. White House General Counsel Pat Cipollone consulted with various companies "to design a federal mandate to keep the plants open and to provide them with additional virus-testing capacity as well as protective gear," according to Bloomberg News. Trump told the press that the order would "solve any liability problems" for meat-processing plants, protecting them from lawsuits potentially incurred due to employee COVID-19 exposures, though the order provided no such immunity or protections. The order gave USDA extraordinary powers to have firms maintain production. The order does not allow companies to ignore safety rules (except for keeping the plants opened), however, and OSHA / CDC guidance remains in force. In September 2020, OSHA fined Smithfield and JBS for failing to take the necessary actions to prevent the spread of coronavirus.

On December 8, 2020, more than a month after losing the 2020 presidential election, then-president Trump said that he would invoke the Defense Production Act to produce vaccine doses, but he did not do so before the end of his term.

In January, 2021, President Joe Biden invoked the Defense Production Act on his second day in office to increase production of supplies related to the pandemic, such as protective equipment. On March 2, President Biden invoked the DPA again to supply equipment to Merck facilities needed to safely manufacture Johnson & Johnson vaccines.

Wildfire crisis 

In September 2021, President Biden invoked the Defense Production Act again to supplement the supply of fire-hose, which is needed because of the unusually high occurrence of dangerous wildfires.

Virginia Class Attack Submarine
In December 2021, President Biden invoked the Defense Production Act to scale production and provide the needed parts and labor training in support of the Virginia Class attack submarines.

Critical Minerals Supply 
In March 2022, President Biden invoked the Defense Production Act to increase the production of minerals necessary for the clean energy transition in the United States, which includes lithium, nickel, cobalt, graphite, and manganese used by large-capacity batteries for energy storage and electric vehicles. The United States currently to date largely relies on foreign sources for the mining and processing of these metals.

Baby formula shortage
On May 18, 2022, President Biden invoked the Act in response to the 2022 United States infant formula shortage, requiring manufacturers to prioritize fulfilling orders of formula ingredients to key suppliers before fulfilling other orders.  The United States Department of Health and Human Services and the United States Department of Agriculture have also been authorized to use Department of Defense aircraft to import formula to the United States from overseas as long as the formula meet US health and safety standards.

Green energy

On June 6, 2022, President Biden invoked the Defense Production Act to accelerate domestic production of green energy technology. The administration responded to growing energy costs caused by Russia's invasion of Ukraine. The invocation came along with a tariff exemption on solar panels from Cambodia, Malaysia, Thailand, and Vietnam. The technology included in Biden's invocation included solar energy; transformers and electric grid components; heat pumps; insulation; and electrolyzers, fuel cells, and platinum group metals.

Hypersonics Industrial Base
On March 11, 2023, President Biden invoked the Defense Production Act to accelerate the rebuilding and expansion of the domestic industrial base on hypersonic technologies, which includes as quoted, "airbreathing engines, advanced avionics position navigation and guidance systems, and constituent materials for hypersonic systems."

See also
 Nationalization

References

Bibliography

 Bell, Douglas, "'A Little-known Bill of Great National Significance': The Uses and Evolution of the Defense Production Act, 1950-2020." US Army Heritage and Education Center Historical Services Division. Carlisle, PA. July 2020. https://ahec.armywarcollege.edu/documents/Defense_Production_Act_1950-2020.pdf.
 "The Defense Production Act: Choice as to Allocations." Columbia Law Review. 51:3 (March 1951).
 Lockwood, David E. Defense Production Act: Purpose and Scope. Washington, D.C.: Congressional Research Service. June 22, 2001.
 Mirsky, Rich. "Trekking Through That Valley of Death—The Defense Production Act." Innovation. June/July 2005.
 National Research Council. Defense Manufacturing in 2010 and Beyond: Meeting the Changing Needs of National Defense. Washington, D.C.: National Academy Press, 1999. 
 Nibley, Stuart B. "Defense Production Act: The Government's Old but Powerful Procurement Tool." Legal Times. April 1, 2002.
 Nibley, Stuart. "Defense Production Act Speeds Up Wartime Purchases." National Defense. June 2006.
 Pierpaoli Jr., Paul G. "Truman's Other War: The Battle for the American Homefront." The Organization of American Historians' Magazine of History. Spring 2000.
 Pierpaoli Jr., Paul G. Truman and Korea: The Political Culture of the Early Cold War. Columbia, Mo.: University of Missouri Press, 1999. 
 Pierpaoli Jr., Paul G. "Mobilizing for the Cold War: The Korean Conflict and the Birth of the National Security State." Essays in Economic and Business History. June 1994.

External links
  (text of the law in the current edition of the United States Code)
 Defense Production Act of 1950 (PDF/details) as amended in the GPO Statute Compilations collection

United States federal defense and national security legislation
Military logistics of the United States
United States in the Korean War
United States Department of Commerce
United States Department of Defense
1950 in American law
COVID-19 pandemic in the United States